Androstanolone may refer to:

 5α-Dihydrotestosterone (5α-androstan-17β-ol-3-one), an endogenous androgen
 5β-Dihydrotestosterone (5β-androstan-17β-ol-3-one), an endogenous steroid
 Androsterone (5α-androstan-3α-ol-17-one), an endogenous androgen and neurosteroid
 Epiandrosterone (5α-androstan-3β-ol-17-one), an endogenous androgen
 Etiocholanolone (5β-androstan-3α-ol-17-one), an endogenous neurosteroid
 Epietiocholanolone (5β-androstan-3β-ol-17-one), an endogenous steroid

See also
 Androstenolone
 Androstanediol
 Androstanedione
 Androstenediol

Androstanes